Lars Funke (born 28 January 1972) is a German speed skater. He competed in two events at the 1994 Winter Olympics.

References

1972 births
Living people
German male speed skaters
Olympic speed skaters of Germany
Speed skaters at the 1994 Winter Olympics
Sportspeople from Erfurt